Andreyas was Emperor of Ethiopia from 1429 to 1430, and a member of the Solomonic dynasty. He was a son of Yeshaq I, succeeded his father when he was very young. According to Al-Maqrizi, his reign lasted only four months, whereas the short chronicles states he reigned for a period of six months. His uncle Takla Maryam reigned after him.

The British explorer James Bruce, who wrote one of the earliest European histories of Abyssinia, reports little more than Andreyas was buried with his father at the Tadbaba Maryam monastery.

References 

1430 deaths
15th-century monarchs in Africa
15th-century emperors of Ethiopia
Solomonic dynasty
Year of birth unknown